David Ron FRS is an Israeli-born and educated UK-based life scientist.

Biography and family 
Raised in an academic family - his parents, Arza and Amiram Ron, were professors of Chemistry and Physics at the Technion and his younger sister Dana Ron Goldreich is a computer scientists at Tel Aviv University - in 1972 he graduated from Municipal High-school III in נוה שאנן, חיפה

Higher education and career

Awarded a medical degree from the Faculty of Medicine, Technion in Haifa Israel in 1980, he went to medical internship and residency training at Mount Sinai Medical Center, in New York City and in 1989 completed subspecialty training in Endocrinology at Massachusetts General Hospital in Boston, followed by four-years of post-doctoral research training with Joel Habner a Howard Hughes Medical Institute Researcher at Harvard Medical School. From 1992 to 2009 he was a member of the faculty at the Skirball Institute of Biomolecular Medicine of New York University School of Medicine and in 2010 he moved to The Clinical School of Cambridge University where he serves as a Wellcome Trust Principal Research Fellow and the Professor of Cellular Pathophysiology and Clinical Biochemistry with a laboratory based at the Cambridge Institute for Medical Research.

Research
His laboratory researches molecular mechanisms by which secretory cells adapt to the burden of unfolded proteins in their endoplasmic reticulum.

Awards and honours
Ron was elected a Fellow of the Royal Society (FRS) in 2014. His nomination reads: 

Ron was elected a Fellow of the Academy of Medical Sciences (FMedSci) in 2013. His nomination reads

References

Living people
Fellows of the Royal Society
Fellows of the Academy of Medical Sciences (United Kingdom)
Wellcome Trust Principal Research Fellows
Technion – Israel Institute of Technology alumni
 Fellows of Churchill College, Cambridge
British biochemists
1955 births